Golden Xplosion (released April 15, 2011 in UK by the label Edition Records – EDN1027) is the second album of the Norwegian saxophonist Marius Neset.

Reception 
The review by John Fordham of the British newspaper The Guardian awarded the album 5 stars, and the reviewer Ivan Hewett of the British newspaper The Telegraph awarded the album 5 stars

Review 
This is a remarkable album by the now 25 years old Norwegian saxophonist Marius Neset. Together with the three companion musicians centered by Django Bates, the brilliant compositions and the excess energy of the band gives the album an elevated expression.

The Guardian critique John Fordham, in his review of Neset's album Golden Xplosion states:

The Telegraph critique Ivan Hewett, in his review of Neset's album Golden Xplosion states:

Track listing 
All compositions by Marius Neset except when otherwise noted
«Introducing: Golden Xplosion» (2:01)
«Golden Xplosion» (5:26)
«City On Fire» (7:42)
«Sane» (3:48)
«Old Poison (XL)» (2:18)
«Shame Us» (6:32) - composed by Marius Neset & Anton Eger
«Saxophone Intermezzo» (2:57) - composed by Marius Neset & Daniel Davidsen
«The Real YSJ» (2:43)
«Saxophone Intermezzo II» (2:22)
«Angel Of The North» (8:20)
«Epilogue» (3:27)

Personnel 
Band quartet
Marius Neset - tenor & soprano saxophones
Django Bates - piano, keyboards, E-flat horn & trumpet
Jasper Høiby  - double bass
Anton Eger - drums

Credits 
Recorded by August Wanngren in the Village Recording, January 26–27, 2010
Mixed by August Wanngren in Wee Know Music Studios
Masered by Thomas Eberger at Stockho
Front cower photo by Siv-Anne Skogen
Additional photo by Tim Dickeson & Dave Stapleton
Artwork Design by Dave Stapleton
Produced by Marius Neset (track # 1,5,7,8,9,11), Marius Neset & Anton Eger (track # 2,3,4,6,10)
Executive roduceer Dave Stapleton

Notes 
This record is supported by the Danish Musician Union

References

External links 
 of Marius Neset

Marius Neset albums
Edition Records albums
2011 albums